Jodłownik may refer to the following places in Poland:
Jodłownik, Lower Silesian Voivodeship (south-west Poland)
Jodłownik, Lesser Poland Voivodeship (south Poland)